Cote 64 is an Indian reserve of the Cote First Nation in Saskatchewan. It is 16 kilometres west of the Manitoba border. In the 2016 Canadian Census, it recorded a population of 748 living in 220 of its 269 total private dwellings. In the same year, its Community Well-Being index was calculated at 51 of 100, compared to 58.4 for the average First Nations community and 77.5 for the average non-Indigenous community.

References

Indian reserves in Saskatchewan
Division No. 9, Saskatchewan
Cote First Nation